Howard Ellsworth Rollins Jr. (October 17, 1950 – December 8, 1996) was an American stage, film, and television actor. Howard Rollins was known for his role as Andrew Young in 1978's King, George Haley in the 1979 miniseries Roots: The Next Generations, Coalhouse Walker Jr. in the 1981 film Ragtime, Captain Davenport in the 1984 film A Soldier's Story, and as Virgil Tibbs on the TV crime drama In the Heat of the Night. In the fall of 1996, Rollins was diagnosed with AIDS. Six weeks later, he died at St. Luke’s-Roosevelt Hospital in New York at the age of 46, from complications from lymphoma. He was interred at Woodlawn Cemetery in his native Baltimore. Over the span of his acting career, Rollins was nominated for an Academy Award, a Golden Globe, and an Emmy.

Early life
Born to Ruth and Howard Ellsworth Rollins Sr. on October 17, 1950 in Baltimore, Maryland, Rollins was the youngest of four children. His mother was a domestic worker, and father a steelworker who died in 1980. After his high school graduation, Rollins studied theater at Towson University.

Career
In 1970, Rollins left college to play the role of "Slick" in the PBS soap opera Our Street. In 1974, he moved to New York City, where he appeared in the Broadway productions of We Interrupt This Program (1975), The Mighty Gents (1978), and G. R. Point (1979). He also appeared in the TV miniseries King and Roots: The Next Generations.

In 1981, Rollins made his film debut in the Dino De Laurentiis/Miloš Forman motion picture Ragtime. His performance in the film earned him an Academy Award nomination for best supporting actor as well as Golden Globe nominations for Best Supporting Actor in a Motion Picture and New Star of the Year in a Motion Picture. The following year, he was nominated for a Daytime Emmy for his role on Another World. In 1984, Rollins starred in director Norman Jewison's film A Soldier's Story, which led to his role as Virgil Tibbs on In the Heat of the Night, the television series based on Jewison's acclaimed 1967 film of the same name.

In the Heat of the Night began airing on NBC in 1988. During the show's run, Rollins struggled with addiction to drugs and alcohol. He was arrested four times for drug and alcohol-related crimes, spending one month in jail for reckless driving and driving under the influence. Due to his ongoing personal and legal issues, Rollins was dismissed from the series at the end of Season 6. Rollins returned for several guest appearances in the seventh season of the show in 1993 – 1994.

While on the series, Rollins recorded "Twas the Night Before Christmas" for the 1991 In the Heat of the Night Christmas CD Christmas Time's A Comin' produced by his co-stars Randall Franks and Alan Autry. Franks wrote the musical score for the classic Christmas story that featured Rollins telling the story to children related to fellow cast members. 
 

After being fired from In the Heat of the Night, Rollins achieved sobriety and worked on rebuilding his career and reputation. In 1995, he appeared in a guest role on New York Undercover, followed by a role in the  film Drunks. In 1996, he appeared in a guest role on Remember WENN. His final acting role was in the 1996 television movie Harambee!.

Personal life

Legal issues
In 1988, Rollins pled guilty to cocaine possession in Louisiana. In 1992 and 1993, he was arrested on three occasions for driving under the influence. In 1994, he served a month in jail for reckless driving and driving under the influence. Because of his legal problems, Rollins was dropped from In the Heat of the Night. After attending drug rehab, he returned to In the Heat of the Night as a guest star.

Death
On December 8, 1996, Rollins died at age 46 at St. Luke's-Roosevelt Hospital Center in New York City from lymphoma-related complications. His funeral was held on December 13 in Baltimore.

Legacy
On October 25, 2006, a wax statue of Rollins was unveiled at the Senator Theatre in Baltimore. The statue is now at Baltimore's Great Blacks in Wax Museum.
Howard is a distant relative to Philadelphia Phillies Jimmy Rollins.

Filmography

References

External links
The Howard E. Rollins Foundation

1950 births
1996 deaths
20th-century American male actors
Male actors from New York (state)
American male film actors
African-American male actors
American male soap opera actors
AIDS-related deaths in New York (state)
Deaths from cancer in New York (state)
Deaths from lymphoma
Male actors from Baltimore
Towson University alumni
American male stage actors
American male television actors
20th-century African-American people